Nag's Head or Nags Head may refer to:

In London 
 Nag's Head, London, a locality in Holloway
 Nag's Head Market, a street market 
 Nag's Head, Covent Garden, a pub

Other meanings 
 Nags Head, North Carolina, USA, a town
 Nag's Head, a promontory in the Scilly Islands
 Nag's Head Fable, a 16th-century story
 Nag's Head Island in Abingdon-on-Thames

See also
 Old Nag's Head, Monmouth, Wales, a pub